Takura is a rural locality in the Fraser Coast Region, Queensland, Australia. In the  Takura had a population of 528 people.

History 
Takura Provisional School opened on 1908. On 1 January 1909 it became Takura State School. It closed on 21 February 1964.

In the  Takura had a population of 528 people.

References 

Fraser Coast Region
Localities in Queensland